Big Chief! is an album by jazz pianist Junior Mance which was recorded in 1961 and released on the Jazzland label.

Track listing
All compositions by Junior Mance except where noted.
 "Big Chief!"4:18   
 "Love for Sale" (Cole Porter)4:58 
 "The Seasons" (Sara Cassey)3:30  
 "Fillet of Soul" (Larry Gales)4:32   
 "Swish"3:44   
 "Summertime" (George Gershwin, DuBose Heyward)4:15   
 "Ruby, My Dear" (Thelonious Monk)6:03   
 "Little Miss Gail"4:50   
 "Atlanta Blues" (W. C. Handy)5:52

Personnel
Junior Mancepiano
Jimmy Rowserbass
Paul Gussmandrums

References

 

1961 albums
Junior Mance albums
Jazzland Records (1960) albums
Albums produced by Orrin Keepnews